Gastrinodes bitaeniaria is a moth of the family Geometridae. It is found in Queensland, New South Wales, South Australia, Victoria and Tasmania.

The larvae feed on Eucalyptus species.

References

Boarmiini
Moths of Australia
Moths described in 1841